The Cropp River is a river of New Zealand. It flows east for  before joining the Whitcombe River, a tributary of the Hokitika River.

On 25–26 March 2019,  of rain fell over the Cropp River, a new record rainfall for a 48-hour period for New Zealand.

See also
List of rivers of New Zealand

References

Land Information New Zealand - Search for Place Names

Westland District
Rivers of the West Coast, New Zealand
Rivers of New Zealand